Lavender Makoni  is a Zimbabwean judge who currently serves as a justice of the Supreme Court of Zimbabwe. Makoni served as a judge in Zimbabwe's High Court from 2002 to 2018, when she appointed as a Supreme Court judge.

References

Judges of the Supreme Court of Zimbabwe
Living people
Year of birth missing (living people)
21st-century Zimbabwean judges
Zimbabwean women lawyers